Richard Ofori (born 24 April 1993) is a Ghanaian professional footballer who plays for Nea Salamis Famagusta FC as a defender.

Club career
Born in Accra, Ofori played youth football for Mighty Jets F.C., signing a one-year loan contract with Charleroi in 2011. Ofori made his competitive debut for Charleroi against Tubize on 29 Abril 2012 in the Belgian Pro League. 
Ofori then signed, on 21 January 2013, a six months loan contract with Lierse. He made his debut from the start in a 2–0 defeat to Zulte Waregem on 26 January 2013.

On 2 September 2013, Ofori was signed by Académica and was immediately sent on loan to Beira-Mar.

References

External links

1993 births
Living people
Ghanaian footballers
Ghana under-20 international footballers
Ghanaian expatriate footballers
Belgian Pro League players
Primeira Liga players
Tudu Mighty Jets FC players
R. Charleroi S.C. players
Lierse S.K. players
S.C. Beira-Mar players
Associação Académica de Coimbra – O.A.F. players
S.C. Covilhã players
AD Fafe players
Ghanaian expatriate sportspeople in Belgium
Ghanaian expatriate sportspeople in Portugal
Expatriate footballers in Belgium
Expatriate footballers in Portugal
2013 African U-20 Championship players
Association football defenders